Isaac Israeli may refer to:

 Isaac Israeli ben Solomon, ninth-century Jewish physician and scientist
 Isaac Israeli ben Joseph, fourteenth-century Jewish astronomer